The  series is a short-lived attempt by Konami to capitalize on the market of portable entertainment in the late 1990s. They were introduced on the Japanese market in 1998 and they featured versions of most Bemani games, from Beatmania to ParaParaParadise.

Beginning in 1998, Bemani Pocket games were used by Nintendo in collaboration with St.GIGA as prizes for national Satellaview competitions and events.

Releases
Partial platform release list:

Beatmania Pocket (1998) and several versions featuring Bemani original music tracks and anime hits.
DDR Pocket (1999). Including Finger Step (1999), DDR Hello Kitty (1999), DDR Dear Daniel (1999), and DDR Winnie the Pooh.
ParaParaParadise Pocket (2001). Capitalizing on the Para Para craze on Japan.
Pop'n Music Pocket (1999). A pocket version of Pop'n Music.
GuitarFreaks Pocket (2000).

References

External links
Fanmade page with information and pictures 

Bemani games
Music video games
Handheld game consoles